Arctostaphylos hispidula is a species of manzanita known by the common names Gasquet manzanita and Howell's manzanita. It is native to the coastal mountain ranges of southern Oregon and northern California, where it is an uncommon member of the serpentine soils flora and other mountain plant communities. This is a spreading or erect shrub reaching a maximum height between one and two meters. The twigs and foliage are bristly and glandular, the dark green leaves oval to broadly lance-shaped and up to 3 centimeters long. The shrub blooms in crowded inflorescences of urn-shaped flowers and produces whitish to tan colored drupes each 5 to 7 millimeters wide.

External links
Jepson Manual Treatment
USDA Plants Profile
Photo gallery

hispidula
Flora of California
Flora of Oregon
Flora of the Klamath Mountains
Natural history of the California Coast Ranges
Plants described in 1901
Flora without expected TNC conservation status